Mount Sneffels is the highest summit of the Sneffels Range in the Rocky Mountains of North America. The summit of Mount Sneffels is the highest point in Ouray County.

Mountain
Mount Sneffels is notable for its great vertical relief, as it rises 7,200 feet above the town of Ridgway, Colorado 6 miles to the northeast.

The primary route to the summit follows a creek bed up from Yankee Boy Basin.  A secondary route follows a ridge line to the summit from the saddle of Blue Lakes Pass.

Mount Sneffels was named after the volcano Snæfell, which is located on the tip of the Snæfellsnes peninsula in Iceland. That mountain and its glacier, Snæfellsjökull, which caps the crater like a convex lens, were featured in the Jules Verne novel A Journey to the Center of the Earth.  An area on the western flank of Mount Sneffels gives the appearance of volcanic crater.

Seen from the Dallas Divide on State Highway 62, Mount Sneffels is one of the most photographed mountains in Colorado.

Historical names
Mount Blaine
Mount Sneffels – 1906 
Sneffels Peak

See also

List of mountain peaks of North America
List of mountain peaks of the United States
List of mountain peaks of Colorado
List of Colorado county high points
List of Colorado fourteeners

References

External links

 

Sneffels
Sneffels
San Juan Mountains (Colorado)
Sneffels
Uncompahgre National Forest
Sneffels